Yun Gee (1906–1963) was a Chinese American modernist artist. He lived and painted in San Francisco, Paris, and New York City, and was considered one of the most daring avant-garde painters during his time.

Biography  
Gee was born in 1906 to Gee Quong On and Wong See in Kaiping. His father was a merchant who lived in San Francisco and, when Gee turned 15 in 1921, Gee crossed the seas to join his father while his mother remained in China. Because the United States' Asian Exclusion Act prohibited legal immigration by Chinese women, once Gee was in San Francisco he never saw his mother again.

Gee was able to obtain US citizenship and later enrolled at the California School of Fine Arts (present day San Francisco Art Institute). He studied painting and drawing with Otis Oldfield, who became his life-long friend. While in San Francisco, Gee lived in Chinatown and became friends with several avant-garde artists like Kenneth Rexroth, Jehanne Bietry-Salinger, John Ferren, Dorr Bothwell, and Ruth Cravath. With this group of artists, Gee and Oldfield established the Modern Gallery on Montgomery Street in 1926. In 1926, Gee also founded the Chinese Revolutionary Artists' Club, where he taught classes in advanced painting techniques and theory. Its initial members were all young Chinese immigrant men, and it had a small studio in Chinatown (at 150 Wetmore Place), which provided much of their subjects. As summarized by Oldfield, the club focused on "doing [modernist oil] work that is essentially Chinese." Art historian Anthony W. Lee, examining Gee's position in the political spectrum at the time between the Chinese Communist Party and the nationalist Kuomintang, wrote that Gee, despite being close to the Kuomintang, probably saw "the club a potential ally of the CP and thought optimistically of a nationalist regime that would incorporate theories and organizational skills from the Soviet Union," although he "was not a doctrinaire Marxist and never joined the CP". The club dissolved sometime in the 1930s.

Paris 
In 1927, Gee moved to Paris under the patronage of Prince and Princess Achille Murat. He quickly befriended prominent artists of the Parisian avant-garde and exhibited his work alongside them at the Salon des Indépendants. While in Paris he also met Princess Paule de Reuss, whom he married in 1930. However, the marriage was challenging for the Princess, as she was disowned by her family and friends. In the same year of their marriage, Gee left Paris for New York and the couple eventually divorced in 1932.

New York 
Gee's artwork was celebrated in New York but despite being included in exhibitions at the Brooklyn Museum and the Museum of Modern Art, Gee struggled during the Depression and experienced strong racial discrimination. Though he was heavily involved with the Chinese community, Gee found New York unbearable and returned Paris in 1936. During this period, his work received critical acclaim. He was exhibited widely, most notably at the Galerie Lion d’Or in Lausanne and Galerie à la Reine Margot.

During World War II, Gee returned to New York in 1939. Three years later, he married Helen Wimmer, who had left New Jersey when she was sixteen to live with him. They had one daughter, Li-Lan, in 1943. According to Wimmer's memoirs, during this period Gee was employed at a defense-industry company, worked six days per week, and returned home to paint at night.

The couple divorced in 1947 and Wimmer eventually went on to be a gallery owner, photography curator, lecturer and writer. Gee succumbed to alcoholism. In 1950, he met Velma Aydelott, who was his companion until he died from stomach cancer in 1963.

Art Work 
While studying in San Francisco, Oldfield's Cézanne-inspired paintings influenced Gee's artistic style, as did Gottardo Piazzoni. As a result, from the onset of his artistic career Gee's work explored the tension and contrast between warm and cool colors. Additionally, Gee was also influenced by Eastern and Western poetry, and frequently wrote original compositions to accompany his paintings. Critics note how his poems combine Chinese style word-play and Taoist themes with the western avant-garde poetic themes of his time, such as the work of Gertrude Stein. Additionally, Gee's separation from his mother was also a reoccurring theme in his artwork.

Critics believe that Gee's subsequent interest in "Diamondism" occurred when he found the Chinese Revolutionary Artists' Club in 1926. Diamondism is a set of art principles that bring together the spiritual, intellectual, and practical aspects of painting. Developed by Gee, Diamondism reflects his interest in perception and the (im)possibility of absolute truth.

During his time in New York, however, Gee's work turned towards the political. He became an active fundraiser for causes in China, where one of his most notable efforts was the completion of a large mural on K Street as a contribution for the Chinese Flood Relief campaign. His artwork during this period synthesized his previous aesthetics with cubist and realist influences. After his divorce from Wimmer, Gee's artwork turned towards an abstract expressionist style that combined both Parisian and Asian influences.

In addition to his artwork, Gee was also a musician and played several traditional Chinese instruments. He was also interested in theater and dance. He was heavily involved in the writing and stage design for "Kuan Chung's Generosity", a WPA Theatre project in 1930 and danced at the Institute of Chinese Studies.

His work was shown in 2011 at the Tina Keng Gallery, Taipei in Taiwan. The exhibit was titled "Yun Gee: The Art of Place".

Exhibitions 
The following list was compiled by the Tina Keng Gallery.

Further reading 

(Online excerpt at yungee.com)

External links 

 Yun Gee Papers, Fales Library and Special Collections at New York University.

References 

Chinese emigrants to the United States
Artists from San Francisco
1906 births
1963 deaths
People from Kaiping
Artists from Guangdong
Deaths from stomach cancer
San Francisco Art Institute alumni
Deaths from cancer in New York (state)